NorthSide is a record label based in Minneapolis, Minnesota that specializes in Nordic roots music. It is associated with Omnium Recordings and East Side Digital. Its president is Rob Simonds, one of the founders of Rykodisc.

The label was most active during the late 1990s and early 2000s, when it played an important role in promoting the music of the Nordic folk revival in North America. It held the North American distribution right for many  Nordic folk and neo-folk musicians, and released the successful, low-priced sampler CDs Nordic Roots 1, 2, and 3. Although still in existence, the label currently has only one band under contract, Väsen, and has retired most of its catalog.

Musicians
Musicians released under this label include:
Mari Boine
Den Fule
Garmarna
Gjallarhorn (band)
Young Bane
Hedningarna
Hoven Droven
JPP
Sanna Kurki-Suonio
Loituma
Anders Norudde
Triakel
Värttinä
Väsen
Wimme

See also 
 List of record labels

References

External links
 
 Interview with founder Rob Simonds

American record labels
American independent record labels
Independent record labels based in Minnesota
Folk record labels